Pierre Asso (1904–1974) was a French stage, film and television actor.

Selected filmography
 Topaze (1936) - Tamise
 La neige sur les pas (1942)
 Les petits riens (1942)
 Box of Dreams (1945) - Le fou (uncredited)
 Patrie (1946) - Pablo
 The Big Meeting (1950) - Père Saint-Michel
 Thirst of Men (1950) - Le Toulonnais
 Quay of Grenelle (1950)- Le vieux du village
 On Trial (1954) - Le maître-chanteur
 Le Combat dans l'île (1962) - Serge
 Lucky Jo (1964)
 Cannabis (1970)
 The Boat on the Grass (1971) - Alexis
 Two Men in Town (1973) - Le directeur de la prison #2 (uncredited)
 Creezy (1974)
 The Flesh of the Orchid (1975) - Le docteur (final film role)

References

Bibliography
 Ann C. Paietta. Teachers in the Movies: A Filmography of Depictions of Grade School, Preschool and Day Care Educators, 1890s to the Present. McFarland, 2007.

External links

1904 births
1974 deaths
French male film actors
People from Nice